Tarnished Angel is a 1938 American drama film directed by Leslie Goodwins from a screenplay by Jo Pagano, based on a story by Saul Elkins. Starring Sally Eilers, Lee Bowman, Ann Miller, and Alma Kruger, the film was produced and distributed by RKO Radio Pictures and released on October 28, 1938.

Plot

Cast
 Sally Eilers as Carol Vinson
 Lee Bowman as Paul Montgomery
 Ann Miller as Violet 'Vi' McMaster
 Alma Kruger as Mrs. Harry Stockton
 Paul Guilfoyle as Edward 'Eddie' Fox
 Jonathan Hale as Detective Sgt. Edward Cramer
 Vinton Hayworth as Dan 'Dandy' Bennett
 Cecil Kellaway as Reginald 'Reggie' Roland

References

External links

1938 drama films
1938 films
American drama films
Films directed by Leslie Goodwins
American black-and-white films
RKO Pictures films
1930s American films